SAS AB (Scandinavian Airlines System Aktiebolag), trading as SAS Group, is an airline holding company headquartered in the SAS Frösundavik Office Building in Solna Municipality, Sweden. It is the owner of the airlines Scandinavian Airlines and Scandinavian Airlines Ireland. SAS once owned 19.9% of the now defunct Spanish airline Spanair as well as shares in Estonian Air and Skyways Express. SAS Group is partially owned by the governments of Sweden and Denmark with a 14.82% and 14.24% holding, respectively. The remaining 70.92% is held by private shareholders, of which Foundation Asset Management owns 6.50%. The company is listed on the Oslo Stock Exchange, the Stockholm Stock Exchange, and the Copenhagen Stock Exchange.

The conglomerate was founded in 1951 as a merger between the three Scandinavian flag carriers Aerotransport (ABA—Sweden), Det Danske Luftfartselskab (DDL—Denmark), and Det Norske Luftfartselskap (DNL—Norway), after the three had been cooperating on international routes since 1946. Until 2001, the three national companies owned a fixed share of the SAS Group, after which the shares of the three companies were merged. The SAS Group previously owned the Rezidor Hotel Group (owner of the Radisson SAS brand) and Braathens and had a minority interest in bmi, airBaltic, Texas Air, Thai Airways International, and LAN Airlines. SAS was a founder of the Amadeus Computerised Reservation System and the Star Alliance, where several of the group's airlines are members. SAS runs the frequent flyer program EuroBonus.

History 
The airline was founded on 1 August 1946 when Det Danske Luftfartselskab A/S, AB Aerotransport, and Det Norske Luftfartselskap AS (the flag carriers of Denmark, Sweden, and Norway) formed a partnership to handle intercontinental traffic to Scandinavia. Operations started on 17 September 1946. The companies then started coordination of European operations in 1948 and finally merged to form the current SAS Consortium in 1951. When established the airline was divided between SAS Danmark (28.6%), SAS Norge (28.6%), and SAS Sweden (42.8%), all owned 50% by private investors and 50% by their respective governments. SAS gradually acquired control of the domestic markets in all three countries by acquiring full or partial control of several local airlines. In May 1997 SAS formed the global Star Alliance network with Air Canada, Lufthansa, Thai Airways International, and United Airlines.

SAS Group Milestones
1918.  AB Aerotransport (ABA), SAS’ Swedish parent company, is founded 
1920	Det Danske Luftfartselskab A/S (DDL), SAS' Danish parent company, is founded
1924	DDL is listed on the Copenhagen Stock Exchange
1927	Det Norske Luftfartselskap A/S (DNL), SAS' Norwegian parent company, is founded
1946	SAS is formed from Det Danske Luftfartselskab A/S (DDL), Det Norske Luftfartselskap A/S (DNL), and Svensk Interkontinental Lufttrafik AB (SILA). The first intercontinental flight is from Stockholm to New York.
1951	DDL, DNL, and ABA form the present SAS Consortium.
1954	SAS is the world's first airline to fly the Copenhagen - Los Angeles polar route in regular scheduled service.
1955	SILA (which owns 50% of ABA) is quoted on the "Stockbrokers' List" in Sweden.
1957	SAS is the first airline to offer "round the world service over the North Pole" from Copenhagen to Tokyo via Anchorage. 
1959	SAS enters the jet age. The first jet aircraft, the Caravelle, is introduced in service.
1960	SAS opens its first hotel, the SAS Royal Hotel Copenhagen. SAS helps set up Thai Airways International, taking a 30% share in the joint venture.
1965	SAS is the first airline to introduce an electronic reservation system.
1967	DNL is listed on the Oslo Stock Exchange.
1971	SAS puts its first Boeing 747 jumbo jet into service.
1977 SAS sells its remaining stakes in Thai Airways. 
1980	SAS opens its first hotel outside of Scandinavia, the SAS Kuwait Hotel. SILA is listed on the Stockholm Stock Exchange.
1981 SAS EuroClass is introduced on all European routes. 
1982 SAS is named the most punctual airline in Europe for the first time. 
1984 SAS receives the Air Transport World's distinction "Airline of the Year" for 1983. 
1986     Spanair is founded. 
1987 SAS cofounds the Amadeus Computerised Reservation System (also known as GDS).
1989 SAS International Hotels owns 40% of Intercontinental Hotels Group. This stake is sold in 1992. 
1994 SAS begins to refocus on airline operations in the SAS Group - selling a number of subsidiaries, along with the franchise of Diners Club Nordic. 
1996 SAS celebrates its 50th anniversary on August 1. SAS parent company changes its name to SAS Danmark A/S, SAS Norge ASA, and SAS Sverige AB. 
1997 SAS is one of the founding members of Star Alliance. 
1998     Air Botnia (Blue1) becomes a wholly owned subsidiary of the SAS Group. 
1999 The SAS Group becomes a majority owner of Widerøe. 
2001 A single SAS share is established. On July 6, SAS is listed on the stock exchanges in Stockholm, Copenhagen, and Oslo. Braathens is acquired by the SAS Group in December. 
2002 Rezidor SAS Hospitality signs a master franchise agreement with Carlson Hotels Worldwide; the agreement comes to an end in 2009.
2003 SAS acquires 49% of the shares in Estonian Air.
2004 Scandinavian Airlines Sverige, SAS Braathens, and Scandinavian Airlines Danmark are incorporated. 
2006 SAS sells its remaining shares in the Rezidor Hotel Group chain.
2007 CEO and President Mats Jansson is inaugurated; SAS sells the SAS Flight Academy.
2010 CEO Jansson departs his position and is replaced by John S. Dueholm on an interim basis. 
2011 Rickard Gustafson becomes the new permanent CEO.
2012 In January Spanair collapses and lead to write-downs of 1.7bn kronor by SAS.
2013 SAS sells 80% of the shares in Widerøe.
2014 SAS sells the cleaning part of SAS Ground Handling to Sodexo.
2015 SAS sells SAS Ground Handling in 14 Airports in Norway to Widerøe Ground Handling. SAS sells Blue1 to CityJet. In November Estonian Air collapses and SAS loses 2.5% of the shares.
2016 SAS sells its remaining 20% stake in Widerøe.
2020 SAS halts most of its traffic from the 16th of March due to the COVID-19 pandemic.

Operations
SAS Group is the main operational company in the SAS consortium. As of January 2017 the SAS Group company structure looks as follows:

Core SAS Holdings
    Scandinavian Airlines
  Scandinavian Airlines Ireland
 SAS Cargo Group (100%)
 SAS Ground Handling (100%)
 SAS Technical Services (100%)

SAS Individual Holdings
  Air Greenland (37.5%)

Head office

The SAS Group head office was previously located on the grounds of the Stockholm Arlanda Airport (ARN) in Sigtuna Municipality, Sweden.

Before spring 2011, it was located in the SAS Frösundavik Office Building.

Partners and alliances 
 Air Greenland has an interline agreement with SAS
 Scandinavian Airlines is member of the Star Alliance. 
 SAS Cargo Group is a member of the WOW Alliance

List of major shareholders

Presidents
1946–1948: Per Norlin
1949–1951: Per Møystad Backe
1951–1954: Per Norlin
1955–1957: Henning Throne-Holst
1958–1961: Åke Rusck
1961–1962: Curt Nicolin
1962–1969: Karl Nilsson 
1969–1978: Knut Hagrup
1978–1981: Carl-Olov Munkberg 
1981–1993: Jan Carlzon
1993–1994: Jan Reinås
1994–2001: Jan Stenberg
2001–2006: Jørgen Lindegaard
2007–2010: Mats Jansson
2010–2011: John S Dueholm
2011–2021: Rickard Gustafson
2021: Anko van der Werff

Financial performance

Prior to 2001, the SAS Group traffic figures did not include airBaltic, Blue1, and Spanair.

Fleet 

The SAS Group fleet consists of the following aircraft as of August, 2019:

On January 4, 2010 the SAS Group announced the sales of 18 surplus MD-80 series aircraft to Allegiant Travel Company. The aircraft, built from 1985 to 1991, were delivered during the first half of 2010.

On August 26, 2010 the SAS Group announced a 5-year lease agreement of 8 MD-90 series aircraft to an undisclosed US airline. The aircraft will be delivered between Q3-2010 and Q2-2011.

On April 10, 2018 the SAS Group announced a deal with Airbus for 35 new Airbus A320neos with another 15 being leased. These aircraft are meant to replace some of SAS's current A320s, as well as their Bombardier CRJ900's. Bringing the total of the type to 80 aircraft.

It is expected that SAS will announce the replacement aircraft for the 737-700/600 variant in 2020 or 2021. The A220 is discussed to be the favorable option.

Destinations

SAS Museum 
The exhibits at the SAS Museum at Oslo Airport, Gardermoen, in Norway, represent an important part of Scandinavian civil aviation history. The museum collections cover Scandinavian Airlines System (SAS) as well as its parent companies: AB Aerotransport (ABA), Det Danske Luftfartselskab (DDL), and Det Norske Luftfartselskap (DNL). A museum was originally established in 1989 in the hangar area at Oslo Airport, Fornebu at the same time as the formation of the DNL/SAS Historic Society. It was built up through the efforts of a group of enthusiasts among retired and active SAS employees. The establishment of the new museum in 2003-2004 is a result of SAS feeling a responsibility to document the history of Scandinavian civil aviation. For this purpose, the airline has entered a partnership with its three national historic societies and the latter undertake the day-to-day work on a volunteer basis. SAS absorbs the rental cost of the museum building and has also provided depots for museum exhibits in Denmark and Sweden. The museum at Oslo's Gardermoen is therefore more than just a continuation of the facility at Fornebu – it is a completely new and considerably expanded Scandinavian museum. It is run by a board that includes representatives of the SAS consortium and the Swedish, Danish, and Norwegian historic societies.

See also

SAS Media

References

External links
SAS Group

 
Holding companies of Sweden
Airline holding companies
Airlines of Sweden
Companies based in Solna Municipality
Holding companies established in 1951
Companies related to the Wallenberg family
Sigtuna Municipality
Holding companies of Denmark
Holding companies of Norway
Companies listed on the Oslo Stock Exchange
Companies listed on Nasdaq Stockholm
Swedish companies established in 1951
Airlines established in 1951